The effects of Hurricane Isabel in North Carolina were widespread, with the heaviest damage in Dare County. The hurricane made landfall in the Outer Banks of North Carolina on September 18. There, storm surge flooding and strong winds damaged thousands of houses. Several locations along North Carolina Highway 12 were partially washed out or covered with debris. Hurricane Isabel produced hurricane-force wind gusts across eastern North Carolina, knocking down trees and power lines. About 700,000 residents lost power due to the storm, although most outages were restored within a few days. The hurricane killed three people in the state – two due to falling trees, and the other a utility worker attempting to restore electricity. Damage in the state totaled $450 million (2003 USD, $  USD).

The National Hurricane Center issued a hurricane watch, and later warning, for the state's coastline in advance of the hurricane's landfall. Local officials issued evacuation orders for 18 counties, along with various flood warnings. In the aftermath of the hurricane, then-President George W. Bush declared a state of emergency for 26 counties in the state, which allocated federal resources to the state. Utility crews from nearby states helped restore power. The United States Geological Survey dredged sand to restore the breach on Hatteras Island, with traffic restored about two months after the hurricane.

Preparations
On September 14 – four days before Hurricane Isabel made landfall – most computer models predicted that Isabel would strike the east coast of the United States between North Carolina and New Jersey. The National Hurricane Center consistently forecast a landfall on North Carolina. Forecasters initially predicted a landfall in the northeastern portion of the state, which became more accurate as the hurricane neared land. Strong confidence in Isabel's final landfall prompted the National Hurricane Center to issue a hurricane watch for the entire North Carolina coastline about 50 hours before Isabel struck land. About 12 hours later, the National Hurricane Center issued a hurricane warning from Cape Fear to the North Carolina/Virginia border, with a tropical storm warning extending southward to South Carolina. The Newport Weather Forecast Office warned for the potential of flash flooding. The office began preparing for the hurricane one week before landfall, and brought additional staff members to assist with hurricane related duties.

On September 16, officials issued a voluntary evacuation for portions of four counties and one entire county. By around 24 hours before landfall, mandatory evacuations were ordered for eight counties, including the state's coastal counties from Cape Fear to the North Carolina/Virginia border. Despite being under a mandatory evacuation, 57% of Outer Banks residents chose not to leave, as well as 77% of residents in storm surge-prone areas of the Pamlico Sound; this was based on a survey taken after the hurricane. Residents who evacuated their homes cited the hurricane's strength and track, as well as statements from officials, as the main reasons for leaving. Evacuees utilized the house of a friend or relative, or a public shelter. Issues related to the evacuations included traffic problems, stalled cars along roads, inadequate route signing, and flooded or damaged roads. By the morning of the hurricane's landfall, 65 shelters were prepared with a capacity of 95,000 people. The American Red Cross prepared 100 feeding vehicles in staging areas, and deployed two mobile kitchens each with the capacity to provide 10,000 meals per day. Additionally, five Southern Baptist Convention kitchens were on standby, in total being able to provide 20,000 meals per day.

Impact

Hurricane Isabel produced hurricane-force wind gusts throughout eastern North Carolina. The winds downed hundreds of trees, leaving about 700,000 people without power across the state. Damage from the hurricane totaled about $450 million (2003 USD, ($  USD)). Three people were killed in the state – a utility worker attempting to restore electricity and two by falling trees.

Outer Banks
Hurricane Isabel first began affecting North Carolina about 15 hours before it struck land. Rough surf and storm surge caused overwash and severe beach erosion throughout the Outer Banks, with flooding in Ocracoke reportedly being up to waist-high.
The high waters washed out a  portion of Hatteras Island between Hatteras and Frisco, creating a new inlet unofficially dubbed Isabel Inlet. The new inlet washed away all utility connections to Hatteras Village, including power lines and water pipes, as well as dunes, three houses, and a portion of North Carolina Highway 12. The storm surge and waves from Isabel resulted in another breach between Hatteras and Hatteras Inlet, in an area without roads or houses. The breach nearly became an inlet, though it was not deep enough for a constant water flow; it had little impact on residents.

Wind and water damage across the Outer Banks was extensive, with monetary damage in Dare County estimated at $350 million (2003 USD, ($  USD)). Strong waves and the storm surge from Hurricane Isabel knocked 30–40 houses and several motels off of their pilings. Two families who did not evacuate were nearly swept out to sea when their home was destroyed; they reached safety despite local rescue being unable to reach them. The rough waves damaged piers in Nags Head, Rodanthe, and Frisco, with three completely destroyed. Several locations along North Carolina Highway 12 were partially washed out or covered with debris, and  sections of pavement on both sides of a bridge near Ocracoke were washed away. Strong waves destroyed a beach access ramp. Several thousand homes and businesses were damaged by the passage of the hurricane, but no deaths or injuries were reported in the Outer Banks.

Southeast North Carolina

Southwest of where Isabel moved ashore, Isabel's effects were lighter than in the Outer Banks. The rainfall collected into ponds roadways, though no severe flooding was reported. Rough waves resulted in moderate beach erosion near Cape Fear and minor erosion along eastward-facing beaches north of Cape Fear.

Damage was minor in southeast North Carolina. Moderate winds inflicted isolated shingle and siding damage along barrier islands. The winds downed several trees, some onto cars and houses. Brief power outages were also reported. Beach erosion damaged a bridge in Bald Head Island. In Chowan County, a business parking lot was under several feet of water due to flash flooding. One person died in Carteret County while trying to restore electricity.

Inland

Isabel produced strong winds throughout inland areas of eastern North Carolina. Sustained winds were lighter, with only a few locations receiving tropical storm strength winds. Tropical storm force wind gusts were reported as far inland as Lumberton, where gusts reached .

The strong storm surge produced significant flooding in Harlowe and Oriental. Several other locations also reported flooding of streets and low-lying areas. The rise of water flooded many homes in Craven County and the eastern portions of Carteret and Pamlico counties. Emergency personnel rescues people who had not evacuated and became trapped by storm surge flooding. Eyewitnesses reported high velocity, waist deep water moving homes, trailers, and other objects many yards inland. As the water retreated, these objects were then dragged back towards the water. A 5 to 8 foot (1.5 to 2.4 m) storm surge struck the western portion of the Albemarle Sound, with significant surge flooding occurring to the west of Edenton. Nearly 60 percent of all homes and business in Chowan County suffered some structural damage due to wind, many of which were the result of large falling trees. One woman died when a tree fell on her vehicle in Chowan County.

Aftermath

Due to its impacts, the name "Isabel" was retired following its usage in 2003, meaning its name will not be used again for an Atlantic hurricane.

Hundreds of residents were stranded in Hatteras following the formation of the new inlet created by rising waters. Many parts of North Carolina Highway 12 were partially washed out, damaged, or reduced one lane, which slowed recovery efforts and the return of homeowners in the Outer Banks. The ferry between Hatteras Island and Ocracoke Island was temporarily halted due to damage after the hurricane, though a small passenger ferry remained available for Hatteras Village residents and emergency workers. Non-residents were barred from being on the Outer Banks for two weeks after the hurricane. Officials considered building a bridge or ferry system across the new inlet, which were dropped in favor of pumping sand and filling the inlet. This was despite opposition from coastal geologists who stated that the evolution of the Outer Banks is dependent on inlets from hurricanes. Dredging operations began on October 17, using sand from the ferry channel to the southwest of Hatteras Island; this choice minimized impact to submerged aquatic vegetation. On November 22, about two months after the hurricane struck, Highway 12 and Hatteras Island were reopened to public access. On the same day, the ferry between Hatteras and Ocracoke was reopened. The breach on the southern end of Hatteras Island was filled in with sand.

Hardware stores experienced great demand for portable generators, chain saws, dehumidifiers, and air movers following the passage of the hurricane. Utility crews from across the country came to the state to assist in returning power, though power outages persisted for several days. Over 2,500 utility members worked, in some cases around the clock, to restore the power. One power company restored power to 68% of its affected customers by the day after Isabel passed through the area. By four days after landfall, 83,000 customers were without power, down from its peak of several hundred thousand.

Hours after Isabel made landfall, then-President George W. Bush issued a major disaster declaration for 26 North Carolina counties. This was later expanded to 47 counties in the state. The order allocated federal funds for the long-term recovery of hurricane-stricken residents and business owners, as well as providing federal funds for the state and local governments to pay 75 percent of the eligible cost for debris removal and emergency services related to the hurricane, including requested emergency work undertaken by the federal government. The order also allowed for the use of federal personnel, equipment and lifesaving systems and the delivery of heavy-duty generators, plastic sheeting, tents, cots, food, water, medical aid and other essential supplies and materials for sustaining human life. By four days after the emergency declaration, assistance checks were first mailed and used by residents to pay for what was not covered by their insurance.

By four days after landfall, FEMA served around 68,000 meals to displaced families. More than a dozen disaster recovery centers were initiated throughout the state. FEMA provided 125,000 pounds of ice in the first few days, and prepared 200,000 pounds of ice and 180,000 liters of water for the following week for the remaining communities without water. By six days after Isabel struck the state, all hospitals were opened and all roads excluding North Carolina Highway 12 were passable due to emergency crews clearing roads with debris. By 12 weeks after the hurricane passed through the state, 54,425 residents applied for federal assistance, with disaster aid totaling $155.2 million (2003 USD, ($  USD)).

See also

List of retired Atlantic hurricane names
List of North Carolina hurricanes (2000–present)

References

North Carolina
Isabel Effect
Hurricane Isabel Effects
2003 in North Carolina
Isabel